Piz Serenastga is a mountain of the Swiss Lepontine Alps, situated near Vals in the canton of Graubünden. It is located north of Piz Aul.

References

External links
 Piz Serenastga on Hikr

Mountains of the Alps
Mountains of Switzerland
Mountains of Graubünden
Lepontine Alps
Two-thousanders of Switzerland
Vals, Switzerland